Jo Boaler (born 18 February 1964) is a British education author and Nomellini-Olivier Professor of Mathematics Education at the Stanford Graduate School of Education. Boaler is involved in promoting reform mathematics and equitable mathematics classrooms. 
She is the co-founder and faculty director of youcubed a Stanford centre that offers free mathematics education resources to teachers, students and parents. She is the author of nine books, including Limitless Mind (2019), Mathematical Mindsets (2016),  What's Math Got To Do With It? (2009) and The Elephant in the Classroom (2010), all written for teachers and parents with the goal of improving mathematics education in both the US and UK.

Education and training 
Jo Boaler received a Bachelors in Psychology from Liverpool University in 1985. Jo Boaler then began her career as a secondary mathematics teacher in urban London secondary schools, including Haverstock School, Camden. After her early career in secondary mathematics education, Boaler received a master's degree in Mathematics Education from King's College London with distinction in 1991. She completed her PhD in mathematics education at the same university and won the award for best PhD in education from the British Educational Research Association in 1997.

Academic career

Early career 
In 1998, Jo Boaler became an Assistant Professor of Mathematics Education at Stanford University in the Graduate School of Education. She became an associate professor in 2000 and left as a full professor in 2006. From 2000 to 2004, Boaler served as the president of the International Organization of Women and Mathematics Education.

In 2006, Stanford mathematician R. James Milgram formally charged Boaler with scientific misconduct, which prompted Stanford University to investigate claims challenging the validity of her research. Stanford's initial investigation concluded by acknowledging ongoing debates in mathematics education and absolving Boaler of scientific misconduct stating that the allegations "do not have substance". Milgram, fellow mathematician Wayne Bishop (California State University) and statistician Paul Clopton published an online paper outlining their complaints about her Railside report. The story was circulated widely on social media and picked up by the national press.

Return to England 
In 2006 Boaler was awarded a posting as the Marie Curie professor at Sussex University by the Marie Curie Foundation. While in England, Boaler authored two books, "What's Math Got To Do With It?" and "The Elephant in the Classroom".

Return to Stanford 
In 2010 Boaler returned to Stanford and resumed her position as Professor of Mathematics Education. In 2013, Boaler taught the first Massive Online Open Course (MOOC) on mathematics education, called "How to Learn Math". Its purpose was to educate teachers and parents about a new way of teaching math to help students overcome their fear of math while improving their academic performance. Over 40,000 teachers and parents participated, with about 25,000 completing the full 2-to-16-hour course. At the end of the course, 95% of survey respondents indicated that they would modify their ways of teaching math. Boaler also provides consultation to other Silicon Valley digital educational institutions, such as Novo-ed, Inner Tube Games, and Udacity. In addition, she teaches workshops on teaching for a growth mindset, drawing upon the work of Carol Dweck, author and developer of the theory of growth mindset.

In 2012 Boaler published an article on her Stanford homepage, accusing Milgram, Bishop (and others) of harassment, persecution, and suppression. Bishop and Milgram each issued rebuttals to Boaler's claims.

Research 
During the early part of Boaler's career, she conducted longitudinal studies of students learning mathematics through different approaches. Her first three-year study in England was published as "Experiencing School Mathematics: Teaching Styles, Sex, and Setting." In 2000, she was awarded a presidential Early Career Award from the National Science Foundation. This funded a four-year study of students learning mathematics through different approaches in three US high schools. In addition to focusing on inquiry-based learning, Boaler's research has highlighted the problems associated with ability grouping in England and the US.

In 2012, Boaler published articles on the links between timed testing and math anxiety. Boaler had conducted research on mathematics, mistakes, and growth mindset with Stanford University professors Carol Dweck and Greg Walton.

Youcubed.org 

In 2013, Boaler founded youcubed.org with Cathy Williams, former director of Mathematics in the Vista Unified School District. The mission of the site is to offer inspirational mathematics resources for mathematics teachers.

Common Core 

As Common Core was being launched in 2015, Boaler pointed out that fluency is often taken to mean memorization and speed. This ignited a controversy in England, prompting Charlie Stripp, director of England's National Centre for Excellence in the Teaching of Mathematics to respond in an op-ed.

2021 California Math Framework 
Boaler is the primary author of the California Department of Education's fiercely debated mathematics draft framework. The draft framework seeks to refocus mathematics education away from acceleration and towards equity. The draft framework recommends all students to take the same fixed set of math courses until their junior year of high school, which critics, including leading mathematicians, say will hold back students.

Awards and honors 
 2000 – 2004 President: International Organisation of Women and Mathematics Education (IOWME)
 2004 Fellow: Center for Advanced Study in the Behavioral Sciences
 2007 Chair of Excellence: The Marie Curie Foundation
 2010 Invited Lecture at The Royal Society
 2014 NCSM (National Council of Supervisors of Mathematics) Kay Gilliland Equity Award
2016 The California Mathematics Council Walter Denham Memorial Award for Leadership
2019 The Nomellini-Olivier Endowed Chair
 2022 Honorary Doctorate from the Open University for "services to education"

References 

 Kozlowski, J. (2012). The Mindset Revolution. Kozlowski, pp. 255.

External links
 Stanford faculty home page

British women academics
Mathematics educators
Mathematics education reform
British expatriate academics in the United States
Alumni of King's College London
Stanford Graduate School of Education faculty
Academics of the University of Sussex
1964 births
Living people
British women mathematicians